The Abbey of Saint-Mathieu de Fine-Terre is a former Breton monastery, whose ruins are found in the territory of what is now the commune of Plougonvelin on Pointe Saint-Mathieu (Breton: Beg Lokmazhe), in the département of Finistère. The Abbey gives the cape its name. It was dedicated to Saint Matthew the Evangelist, whose skull it housed. It was a Benedictine abbey, and was revived and reformed by the Maurists in the mid-17th century.<ref>[https://archive.org/details/dictionnairehist04og/page/334/mode/2up Jean Ogée, 1778: Dictionnaire historique et géographique de la province de Bretagne (online)]</ref>

 History 

According to legend the first abbey here was founded in the 6th century by Saint Tanguy, chosen for its isolated location among the lands he had inherited, extending from the river of Caprel (haven of Brest) to Penn ar Bed. This allowed the Abbey to be generally cut off from the world but still traversable via being close to the sea.

References

 Bibliography 

All  unless otherwise noted.
 Dom Yves Chaussy, L'abbaye de Saint-Mathieu de Fine-Terre, Esquisse de son histoire, Bulletin de la Société Archéologique du Finistère, t. CXXII, 1993.
 Y. Chevillotte, Recueil de textes sur l'abbaye de Saint-Mathieu de Fin-de-Terre, Bulletin de l'association Histoires et choses d'autrefois à Plougonvelin, fascicule 17, 1997.
 M-C Cloitre, L'abbaye retrouvée, in Saint-Mathieu de Fine-Terre, actes du colloque, Bannalec, 1995.
 R. Daniel, La mort de l'abbaye bénédictine de Saint-Mathieu de Fine-Terre, Bulletin de la Société Archéologique du Finistère, t. XCII, 1964.
 J-Y Eveillard, La pointe Saint-Mathieu, in Saint-Mathieu de Fine-Terre, actes du colloque, Bannalec, 1995.
 H. Guillotel, Les vicomtes de Léon sont-ils les fondateurs de l'abbaye de Saint-Mathieu ?, in Saint Mathieu de Fine-Terre, actes du colloque, Bannalec, 1995.
 R. Largillière, Les saints dans l'organisation chrétienne primitive dans l'Armorique bretonne, Crozon, 1995
 G. Le Duc, La Translation de saint Mathieu, in Saint-Mathieu de Fine-Terre, actes du colloque, Bannalec, 1995.
 M. Le Goffic, Du probable agrandissement du collatéral sud de l'abbatiale au XIIIe siècle, in Saint-Mathieu de Fine-Terre, actes du colloque, Bannalec, 1995.
 B. Merdrignac, Les Navigations fabuleuses dans les Vies des saints bretons, in Saint-Mathieu de Fine-Terre, actes du colloque, Bannalec, 1995.
 F. Roudaut, L'abbaye de Saint-Mathieu, de l'introduction de la Réforme mauriste (1656) à la Révolution, in Saint-Mathieu de Fine-Terre, actes du colloque, Bannalec, 1995.
 R. Sanquer, Plougonvelin, Abbaye de Saint-Mathieu, Bulletin de la Société archéologique du Finistère, tome CI, 1973.
 B. Tanguy, Saint-Mathieu, le haut Moyen Âge : légende et histoire, in Saint-Mathieu de Fine-Terre, actes du colloque, Bannalec, 1995.
 A. Villecroux, La "Navigation" des moines de Saint-Mathieu, in Saint-Mathieu de Fine-Terre, actes du colloque'', Bannalec, 1995.

Buildings and structures in Finistère
Benedictine monasteries in France
Ruins in Brittany
Tourist attractions in Finistère
Monuments historiques of Finistère